The Obria Group is a 501(c)(3) non-profit that runs women's medical clinics in the United States. They have 18 clinics in 6 states. Per Charity Navigator, they have a passing score of 77 as a charitable organization.  

In 2018, they applied for but were turned down for a title X grant because they did not provide hormonal birth control. In 2019, they received millions of dollars of grants of title X funding from the Trump administration after promising to provide birth control. The grant garnered criticism because title X grants are intended to fund family planning services, which the centres did not at the time of award provide, aside from advising less effective methods such as abstinence and the rhythm method. Google has been criticized for giving them grants for ads that have been called "deceptive."

The Obria Group were previously known under the name Birth Choice Health Clinics.

References

External links
 health-related 

Crisis pregnancy centers
Religious organizations based in the United States
Charities based in California